Margaret Bryan  is a British retired diplomat. She served as Ambassador to Panama from 1986 until 1989. Bryan had been appointed Consul at Kinshasa on 31 March 1980.

Personal life
Bryan was the daughter of James Grant and Dorothy Rebecca Galloway. She married Peter Bernard Bryan in 1952. Their marriage was dissolved in 1981.

References 

Companions of the Order of St Michael and St George
Ambassadors of the United Kingdom to Panama
British women ambassadors
Possibly living people
1929 births